The Qualifying Grand Prix of Poland was the seventh qualifying Gliding Grand Prix for the FAI World Grand Prix 2009. Because the usage of handicaps is not allowed in the Grand Prix style of competitions, only the planes with handicap index 101 from Club class were allowed. This gliders are: ASW19, B; Cirrus CS 11-75 L; Cirrus G(w); Cirrus; Cirrus B(w);
DG 100; Hornet (w); Jantar std 2 i 3; Brawo; Ls 1f, 45; Std Libelle 17m; SZD 59.

External links 
 https://web.archive.org/web/20080511231854/http://www.fai.org/gliding/QSGP0809

Gliding competitions
Gliding
Gliding in Poland
2009 in Polish sport
2009 in air sports